Daniel William Carter  (born 5 March 1982) is a retired New Zealand rugby union player.

Carter played for Crusaders (Super Rugby) in New Zealand and played for New Zealand's national team, the All Blacks. He is the highest point scorer in test match rugby, and is considered by many experts as the greatest ever first five-eighth (fly-half) in the history of the game. He was named the International Rugby Board Player of the Year in 2005, 2012 and 2015 (equaling the record three awards of Richie McCaw) and has won three Super Rugby titles with the Crusaders, and nine Tri-Nations and Rugby Championships with the All Blacks.

Carter played for the All Blacks in their Rugby World Cup winning teams in both 2011 and 2015, becoming one of 21 players to have won multiple Rugby World Cups. In 2011, he suffered a groin injury during the pool stage; in 2015, he played during the entire tournament, including in the final against Australia, where he kicked four penalties, two conversions, and a drop goal, and was named the man of the match.

In 2015, Carter released his autobiography named 'Dan Carter: The Autobiography of an All Blacks Legend'.

In 2019, 'Dan Carter: A Perfect 10', a documentary film about Carter's personal life and the challenges he encountered on his road to winning the 2015 Rugby World Cup was released.

Early life
Carter was born in a small town 10 minutes drive from the Carter family home in Leeston in the South Island of New Zealand, to Neville and Bev Carter and has one older sister, Sarah. From the age of 5, he played with Southbridge Rugby Club as a half back (scrum half) and would go on to make representative teams for Ellesmere & Canterbury Country. He attended Ellesmere College where he played mostly at first five-eighth, and then in his final year he transferred to Christchurch Boys' High School to further his chances of making it big in rugby. Some have said he was a shy and quiet young man who kept grand aspirations to himself. His great uncle was Canterbury and New Zealand half back Bill Dalley, a member of the 1924–25 Invincibles and later a Canterbury rugby administrator.

Domestic career

Carter made his provincial debut for Canterbury in 2002, and in 2003 was signed by the Super Rugby side the Crusaders. Initially playing mainly at second five-eighth Carter reached the final of the Super 12 competition with the Crusaders in 2003, 2004, 2005 and 2006. Although they lost the 2003 and 2004 finals, in 2005 Carter had moved to first five-eighth. He regularly played with first-five eighth Andrew Mehrtens before Mehrtens left the team following their 2004 season. In 2005 and 2006 the Crusaders won the competition, and in the 2006 season Carter scored the most individual points for a player in one season with 221.

In April 2008, Carter was linked with several European clubs. In June 2008, Carter made the decision to sign a six-month contract with French club side Perpignan, who then paid Carter the equivalent of £30,000 per game, during his sabbatical season.
On 31 January 2009 Carter ruptured his Achilles tendon playing for Perpignan against Stade Francais, but Perpignan still managed to win the Top 14 despite Carter being injured for the remainder of the season.

He recovered in time to play for his home provincial union, Canterbury, in the opening game of the 2009 Air New Zealand Cup. He then won selection to play for the All Blacks against Australia on 22 August 2009 after a few months of recovery. In May 2012, Carter was the top scorer in Super Rugby history, with 1301 points.

In December 2014 it was announced Carter would be joining Parisian club Racing Metro after the 2015 Rugby World Cup, on a three-year deal worth a reported €1,500,000 a season, making him the world's highest paid rugby player. In November 2015 Carter revealed that, while recovering from an Achilles tendon tear in 2013, he met with Robert Kraft, the owner of the New England Patriots of the National Football League about possibly joining the team as a kicker. On 24 June 2016, Carter helped Racing Metro win the 2016 Top 14 final with a 29–21 win against Toulon at Camp Nou, Barcelona scoring 15 points (5 penalties) and was named Man of the Match despite being down to 14 men 18 minutes into the game after teammate Maxime Machenaud got sent off for a dangerous tackle on Australian international Matt Giteau.

On 25 November 2017, Carter left Racing 92 in France at the end of the season.

On 16 July 2018, Carter joined Kobelco Steelers, a club in the Japanese Top League.

On 17 February 2019, it was announced that Dan Carter was returning to Racing 92 as injury cover after Patrick Lambie was forced to retire due to concussions.

On 4 June 2020, it was announced that Dan Carter was joining The Blues for Super Rugby Aotearoa. However he never made a professional appearance for the side.

On 20 February 2021, Dan Carter announced that he was retiring from professional rugby via his Instagram.

International career

In June 2003, Carter made his All Blacks debut at age 21 in Hamilton, New Zealand, scoring 20 points against Wales. He was then capped against France in Christchurch, which the All Blacks won 31–23. He was also a substitute in a match against Australia (the Wallabies) in Sydney, which the All Blacks won 50–21. Carter was then included in New Zealand's 2003 Rugby World Cup squad, where he first gained serious international attention. Carter spent much of the later stages of the tournament on the bench leaving New Zealand without a specialist goal-kicker. However, he did play in the games against Italy in Melbourne, which the All Blacks won 70–7, and the wins over Canada and Tonga. Although he has been an All Black since 2003 he only secured a permanent position as the first five-eighth in the team during the 2004 tour to the United Kingdom and France displacing Carlos Spencer. He had been playing as a second five-eighths up until the end of the 2004 Tri-Nations.

In 2005, Carter starred in the All Blacks 48–18 win over the British & Irish Lions. He scored two tries, five penalties, and four conversions. He ended the match with 33 points, passing the previous All Blacks record of 18 points in a Lions Test (Carter's second-half total of 22 points by itself was sufficient to top this). The performance was later described by The Guardian as "the definitive fly-half display of the modern era".
 Carter was named IRB Player of the Year in 2005, becoming the first New Zealander to win the award.

On 27 November 2010, after scoring a halfway penalty against Wales, Carter became the highest point scorer of all time, overtaking England's Jonny Wilkinson's previous record of 1,178 although Wilkinson took the record back on 26 February 2011 against France. Carter reclaimed the record on 30 July 2011 when he advanced to 1,204 points in the first tri-nations match of the 2011 series against South Africa. He has currently scored a total of 1,598 test points (29 tries, 293 conversions, 281 penalties, and 8 drop goals) in 112 tests, with an average of 14.27 points a game (the highest average for players who have scored more than 500 Test points). Along with Richie McCaw Carter earns 750,000 NZD a year being the joint highest paid player in New Zealand. This high paying contract by the New Zealand Rugby Union is not subject to form or fitness as both players are regarded as integral to the All Blacks 2011 Rugby World Cup plans. It was announced on 1 October that Carter would captain the All Blacks for the first time against Canada. However, it was later announced that Carter would miss the rest of the 2011 Rugby World Cup after tearing a groin tendon during the final training session before the match against Canada. Carter has signed a contract to re-sign with the NZRU until 2015.

Carter was named IRB Player of the Year in 2012, but eyebrows were raised when he missed out being named in the shortlist for New Zealand Player of the Year.
On 16 November 2013, Carter became the fifth All Black to play 100 caps when New Zealand defeated England by 30–22 at Twickenham on their end of year tour.

On 17 July 2015, Carter and Richie McCaw played their final match in Christchurch together, after Carter took a deal to play for Racing Metro in France. On 15 August 2015 Carter played his final test in New Zealand in the Bledisloe Cup decider at Eden Park, a trophy he has never lost since his debut. He later appeared with McCaw in a Men In Black themed safety video for Air New Zealand.

In the 2015 Rugby World Cup Final against Australia, Carter scored four penalties, converted two tries (with the final one taken with his right boot), and kicked a drop goal that gave the All Blacks the winning moment. Due to the performance, he was named the Man of the Match. Following the All Blacks' victory, he received the IRB Player of the Year award for the third time.

International record
Test record overall:

Test tries:

Personal life
Carter became engaged to his longtime girlfriend and former Black Sticks striker Honor Dillon in October 2010 when she was a marketing manager at DB Breweries. The couple married on 9 December 2011, and have gone on to have four children. Wedding guests included Richie McCaw and All Blacks former coach Graham Henry.

Carter has modelled for Jockey underwear on billboards worldwide since 2003. In 2009, Carter's future wife joined him in one campaign. In 2004 and 2005, Carter was voted sexiest New Zealand male in a survey, receiving 35.7% of the vote in 2005. In 2008, American Cable Channel E! judged Carter to be 11th on its list of the world's sexiest men, and in 2010 E! voted him the world's 3rd sexiest male athlete.

Carter has also been a spokesmodel for Daikin heat pumps, and from mid-2011, Philips electric shavers.

In November 2006, Carter released his book Dan Carter: Skills & Performance. It included stories about his relatively brief international rugby career as well as section on skills for younger players.

In February 2017, Carter was caught driving in Paris with a blood alcohol level nearly twice the legal limit. He was subsequently dropped by his sponsor, Land Rover.

In May 2018, Dan Carter revealed that he declined the offer to switch to National Football League (NFL) as a kicker for New England Patriots after The Rugby World Cup in 2015.

Honours

Canterbury
 NPC/Air New Zealand Cup Champion, 2001, 2004, 2008, 2009 and 2010
 Ranfurly Shield holder

Crusaders
 Super Rugby Champion 2005, 2006 and 2008
 NZ Conference Winner, 2011
 Super Rugby Centurion

Perpignan
 Top 14 Champion 2009

Racing 92
Top 14 Champion 2016

Kobelco Steelers
Top League Champion 2018

New Zealand
 Rugby World Cup champion, 2011 and 2015	
 Tri Nations/The Rugby Championship champion, 2003, 2005, 2006, 2007, 2008, 2010, 2012, 2013 and 2014
 Bledisloe Cup 2003 - 2015
 British & Irish Lions series victory, 2005
 Home Nations Grand Slam Tour, 2005, 2008 and 2010
 All Black test centurion

Personal accolades
 Kelvin Tremain Memorial Trophy (NZ Player of the Year) 2004 and 2005
 Rebel Sport Super 14 Player of the Year 2004 and 2006
 IRB Player of the Year 2005, 2012 and 2015 (Nominee in 2006 and 2008)
 BBC Overseas Sports Personality of the Year 2015
 Officer of the New Zealand Order of Merit for services to rugby, 2016 New Year Honours.
 Laureus World Sports Award for Comeback of the Year 2016
 All Time Super Rugby Leading Points Scorer
 All Time International Rugby Leading Point Scorer

See also
 List of male underwear models

References

External links

 
 Official Dan Carter YouTube Channel
 
 Daniel Carter | Rugby Database Profile
 Dan Carter Videos
 ESPN Profile
 http://www.stuff.co.nz/life-style/64382561/dan-and-honor-carter-expecting-second-child
 Itsrugby.co.uk Profile

1982 births
Living people
New Zealand international rugby union players
New Zealand male models
Canterbury rugby union players
Crusaders (rugby union) players
USA Perpignan players
Racing 92 players
Rugby union centres
Rugby union fly-halves
World Rugby Awards winners
World Rugby Players of the Year
People educated at Christchurch Boys' High School
People from Leeston
New Zealand expatriate rugby union players
New Zealand expatriate sportspeople in France
Expatriate rugby union players in France
Officers of the New Zealand Order of Merit
Laureus World Sports Awards winners
BBC Sports Personality World Sport Star of the Year winners
Rugby union players from Canterbury, New Zealand
Fell family
Buckland family